Caurinus is a genus of snow scorpionflies in the family Boreidae. There are at least two described species in Caurinus.

Species
These two species belong to the genus Caurinus:
 Caurinus dectes Russell, 1979
 Caurinus tlagu Sikes & Stockbridge, 2013

References

Further reading

 
 
 

Snow scorpionflies
Articles created by Qbugbot